Elizabeth Patricia Norris Allan (born 6 November 1948) is a New Zealand former cricketer who played primarily as a right-arm medium bowler. She appeared in 4 Test matches and 7 One Day Internationals for New Zealand between 1972 and 1978. She played domestic cricket for North Shore.

References

External links

1948 births
Living people
Cricketers from Auckland
New Zealand women cricketers
New Zealand women Test cricketers
New Zealand women One Day International cricketers
North Shore women cricketers